Michael Kapsner (born 29 June 1961) is a German composer, organist, conductor, improvisator and music educator. He teaches at the University of Music Franz Liszt Weimar.

Life 
Born in Passau, Kapsner received his first organ lessons from Toni Glas in Passau. From 1988 to 1990, he worked as a church musician in Freiburg.

In 1991, Kapsner founded an orchestra and worked as a freelance organist and conductor until 2000; between 1993 and 1999, he conducted the Freiburg Oratorio Choir. From 1994 to 2001, Kapsner was a lecturer for organ and improvisation at the Trossingen College of Music. Between 2000 and 2004, he was professor of organ and improvisation at the University of Music and Performing Arts Graz. In 2004 he moved to the University of Music Franz Liszt Weimar in the same capacity.

Kapsner is a laureate of international organ competitions, including the Bach Prize Bruges in 1985. He has been active as an organist and improviser in concerts and has participated as a juror in international competitions.

References

External links 
 
 Michael Kapsner on the Website of the Hochschule Franz Liszt

20th-century classical composers
German classical organists
German male organists
Academic staff of the University of Music and Performing Arts Graz
Academic staff of the Hochschule für Musik Franz Liszt, Weimar
German composers
21st-century organists
21st-century German male musicians
1961 births
Living people
People from Passau
Male classical organists